Peppy San (1959–1989), a Quarter Horse stallion, has the distinction of the being the first National Cutting Horse Association (or NCHA) World Champion to sire an NCHA World Champion.

Life

Peppy San was foaled in 1959, a sorrel stallion sired by Leo San and out of a mare named Peppy Belle. His sire was a son of Leo and was out of a descendant of Traveler and Peter McCue named San Sue Darks. Peppy San's dam was by Pep-Up who was bred by the King Ranch and was a double descendant of Old Sorrel. Peppy San's second dam was a mare from the 6666 Ranch named Belle Burnett.

Cutting career 
Peppy San was ridden for many years by Matlock Rose in cutting contests, before turning to a stud career. With the NCHA he earned $49,478.40 in cutting contests, receiving their Certificate of Ability, Bronze, and Silver awards. He was inducted into the NCHA Hall of Fame He was also the 1967 NCHA World Champion Cutting horse and the Reserve Champion in the 1962 NCHA Cutting Futurity. With the American Quarter Horse Association (or AQHA) he was the 1967 High Point Cutting Stallion as well as an AQHA Champion, Superior Cutting Horse and a Performance Register of Merit earner. He was humanely put down due to the effects of old age on April 26, 1989.

Breeding record 
Among Peppy San's numerous offspring were Peponita, Sanacee, Miss Peppy Gay Bar, Royal Santana, Sonita's Last, San Tip and Peppy's Desire. Peponita was inducted into the NCHA Hall of Fame as well as being the NCHA World Champion Cutting Horse for both 1977 and 1979. Three of his offspring won the NCHA Cutting Derby – Chunky's Monkey, Tip It San, and Peppy Lena San.

Honors 
Peppy San was inducted into the AQHA Hall of Fame in 1991.

Pedigree

Notes

References

 All Breed Pedigree Database Pedigree of Peppy San retrieved on June 26, 2007
 AQHA Hall of Fame accessed on September 1, 2017
 
 NCHA Horse Hall of Fame retrieved September 4, 2017
 Peppy San NCHA Earnings retrieved on September 4, 2017

External links
 Peppy San at Quarter Horse Directory
 Peppy San at Quarter Horse Legends

Cutting horses
American Quarter Horse sires
1959 animal births
1989 animal deaths
AQHA Hall of Fame (horses)
NCHA Hall of Fame (horses)